Simeunović is a Serbian surname, a patronymic derived from Simeun. It may refer to:

Vojislav Simeunović (born 1942), Serbian football coach and former player
Dragan Simeunović (born 1954), former Yugoslav football goalkeeper
Marko Simeunović (born 1967), Slovenian-Serbian former football goalkeeper
Milan Simeunović (born 1967), Serbian former football goalkeeper
Nemanja Simeunović (born 1984), Serbian footballer
Đorđe Simeunović (born 1995), Serbian basketball player

See also
Simeonović
Simonović

Serbian surnames
Surnames from given names